Cymindis quadrisignata is a species of ground beetle in the subfamily Harpalinae. It was described by Édouard Ménétries in 1848.

References

quadrisignata
Beetles described in 1848